The BRP Simeon Castro (PC-374) is the fourth ship of the Jose Andrada class coastal patrol boats of the Philippine Navy. It is part of the first batch of its class ordered through US Foreign Military Sales (FMS) in 1989, and was commissioned with the Philippine Navy on 24 June 1991. It was initially designated as Fast Patrol Craft, and was numbered "DF-374", but later on was re-designated as a Patrol Gunboat, and was re-numbered as "PG-374", until another round of reclassification changed its designation as a Patrol Craft with hull number "PC-374" from April 2016.

Notable operations / exercises
Simeon Castro conducted relief operations sorties to economically displaced families of Cagraray Island, Bacacay, Albay starting 11 January 2011 as part of the local government of Albay's "Food for Work" program.

The Simeon Castro rescued 58 passengers of Ro-Ro vessel MV Vanessa P2 off Sayao Bay, Marinduque on 13 May 2011 after responding to a distress call from Coast Guard Station Marinduque.

In April 2018, the BRP Simeon Castro along with the Philippine Coast Guard (PCG) responded to a distress call and rescued the passengers of the motor boat M/B Kidd Dodong after it broke an outrigger due to big waves. The boat was found after a brief search in the vicinity of Guintunguan Island in El Nido, and the BRP Castro took half of the boat's fourteen passengers (the other half were taken by the PCG) to the Liminangcong Pier in Palawan.

In July 2018, the BRP Simeon Castro participated in a Maritime Security Activity (MSA) with the Royal Australian Navy (RAN) in the waters around Palawan along with the  frigate.

Technical details
The ship was built to US Coast Guard standards with aluminum hull and superstructure.

The ship originally designed to carry one bow Mk.3 40 mm gun, one 81 mm  mortar aft, and four 12.7 mm/50 caliber machine guns. Instead, she is armed with only four M2HB Browning 12.7 mm/50 caliber machine guns on Mk.26 mounts, with two positioned forward and two aft; and two M60 7.62 mm/30 caliber machine guns, both mounted amidships. The ship can carry 4,000 rounds of 12.7 mm and 2,000 rounds of 7.62 mm A large "Big Eyes" binocular is also carried on tripod mounts, one on the forecastle and one just above the mast.

As part of the first batch (PG-370 to PG-378), it is not equipped with Mk.38 Mod.0 Bushmaster 25mm chain gun. It was planned to install either a stabilized or unstabilized M242 25 mm Bushmaster chain gun on her bow after some minor modifications, but as of to date has not materialized.

She is equipped with a Raytheon AN/SPS-64(V)11 surface search and navigation radar but with a smaller antenna as those used in bigger Philippine Navy ships.

A 4-meter rigid inflatable boat powered by a 40-hp outboard motor is stowed amidships.

Footnotes

References

External links
 Philippine Navy Official website
 Philippine Fleet Official Website
 Philippine Defense Forum

Patrol vessels of the Philippine Navy
1991 ships